Milan is a city in northern Italy, capital of Lombardy, and the second-most populous city in Italy after Rome, with the city proper having a population of 1,366,037 while its metropolitan municipality has a population of 3,235,000. Its continuously built-up urban area (that stretches beyond the boundaries of the Metropolitan City of Milan) has a population estimated to be about 5,270,000 over 1,891 square kilometres. Milan is the Italian city that has grown more vertically through the construction of skyscrapers. As of May 2018, there are 25 completed and under construction buildings that stand at least 100 mt. in Milan.

This includes spires and architectural details but does not include antenna masts; an equal sign (=) following a rank indicates the same height between two or more buildings. (U/C Under Construction - U/R Under Renovation)

Buildings under construction

Towers proposed, planned

References

Milan

Tallest buildings